Martha Long is an Irish author best known for the 'Ma...' series.

Early life
Martha Long was born in Dublin in the early 1950s and still lives there today. She calls herself a "middle-aged matron" and has had three children.

Career
Her bestselling autobiographies, the Ma... series, recount a personal history of abuse, depravation and cruelty – from early life into adulthood. The critically acclaimed debut memoir, Ma, He Sold Me For a Few Cigarettes, shot into the Irish bestseller list in 2007. Over the past four years, Long has bought out four further instalments which have all had success across Ireland and the UK, and made it to number one in the Irish Times bestseller list. Long is published by Mainstream Publishing, an associate of Random House in the UK and by Seven Stories Press in the US.

Long's sixth book, Ma, I've Reached for the Moon an I'm Hittin the Stars was released in Dublin on 12 September 2012.

Works
The Ma... series
 Ma, He Sold Me for a Few Cigarettes (Mainstream, Edinburgh, 2007) (Seven Stories Press, U.S., 2012)
 Ma, I’m Gettin Meself a New Mammy (Mainstream, Edinburgh, 2008) (Seven Stories Press, U.S., 2015)
 Ma, It's a Cold Aul Night an I’m Lookin for a Bed (Mainstream, Edinburgh, 2009) (Seven Stories Press, U.S., 2015)
 Ma, Now I'm Goin Up in the World (Mainstream, Edinburgh, 2010)
 Ma, I’ve Got Meself Locked Up in the Mad House (Mainstream, Edinburgh, 2011)
 Ma, I've Reached for the Moon an I'm Hittin the Stars (Mainstream, Edinburgh, 2012)
 Ma, Jackser's Dyin' Alone  (Mainstream, Edinburgh, 2013)
 Run, Lily, Run (Mainstream, Edinburgh, 2016)

References

1950s births
Living people
Irish writers